Tooke's Pantheon, full title Tooke's Pantheon of the Heathen Gods and Illustrious Heroes, was a work on Greek mythology. Authored by the Jesuit François Pomey (1619–1673), the Pantheum mythicum seu fabulosa deorum historia became the mythological handbook of the following two centuries.

Classical scholar Samuel Petiscus, engaged by the publisher to correct the sixth edition, advises the "Friendly Reader" that this book, deriving from Boccaccio, Giraldi, and Conti, was invaluable in the classical instruction of "studious youths". It was translated into English in 1698 by Andrew Tooke, later Headmaster of Charterhouse School, who was silent about the author of the original. It became known as Tooke’s Pantheon of the Heathen Gods and Illustrious Heroes and was reprinted twenty-three times by 1771. It was published as "adapted for the use of students of every age and either sex" in America as late as 1859.

References

1698 books
References on Greek mythology